Cox's Bazar is a city, fishing port, tourism centre, and district headquarters in Southeastern Bangladesh. Cox's Bazar is also known by the name Panowa, which translates literally as "yellow flower." Another old name was "Palongkee".

The modern Cox's Bazar derives its name from Captain Hiram Cox, an officer of the British East India Company, a Superintendent of Palongkee outpost. To commemorate his role in refugee rehabilitation work, a market was established and named after him. It is one of Bangladesh's main tourist spots. The city has the longest uninterrupted natural beach in the world. Every year more than a million visitors visit the city from around the world.

History
During the early 9th century, the greater Chittagong area, including Cox's Bazar, was under the rule of Arakan kings until its conquest by the Mughals in 1666. When the Mughal Prince Shah Shuja was passing through the hilly terrain of the present-day Cox's Bazar on his way to Arakan, he was attracted to its scenic and captivating beauty. He commanded his forces to camp there. His retinue of one thousand palanquins stopped there for some time. A place named Dulahazara, meaning "one thousand palanquins," still exists in the area. After the Mughals, the place came under the control of the Tipras and the Arakanese, followed by the Portuguese and then the British.

The name Cox's Bazar originated from the name of a British East India Company officer, Captain Hiram Cox, who was appointed as the Superintendent of Palonki (today's Cox's Bazar) outpost. He succeeded Warren Hastings, who became the Governor of Bengal following the British East India Company Act in 1773. Cox embarked upon the task of rehabilitation and settlement for the Arakanese refugees in the area. He rehabilitated many refugees in the area, but died in 1799 before finishing his work. To commemorate him, a market was established and named after him, called Cox's Bazar. Cox's Bazar was first established in 1854 and became a municipality in 1869.

After the Sepoy Mutiny in 1857, the British East India Company was highly criticised on humanitarian grounds, especially for its opium trade monopoly over the Indian Sub-Continent. However, after its dissolution on January 1 1874, the company's assets, including its armed forces, were acquired by the British Crown. After this takeover, Cox's Bazar was declared a district of the Bengal Province under the British Crown.

20th century

Just after the end of British rule in 1947, Cox's Bazar became part of East Pakistan. Captain Advocate Fazlul Karim, the first post-independence chairman of Cox's Bazar Municipality, established the Tamarisk Forest along the beach. He wanted to attract tourists as well as to protect the beach from tsunamis. He donated much of his father-in-law's and his own lnds as sites for constructing a public library and a town hall. Karim was inspired to build Cox's Bazar as a tourist spot after seeithe ng beaches of Bombay and Karachi, and was a resort pioneer in developing Cox's Bazar as a destination. Karim established a maternity hospital, the stadium and the drainage system by procuring grants from the Ford Foundation and Rockefeller Foundation through correspondence. T. H. Matthews, the principal of the Dacca Engineering College (1–49~1954), was a friend who had helped him in these fundraising efforts. Engineer Chandi Charan Das was the government civil engineer who worked on all these projects.

In 1959 the municipality was turned into a town committee.

In 1961 the Geological Survey of Pakistan initiated investigation of radioactive minerals like monazite around the Cox's Bazar sea-beach area.

In 1971, Cox's Bazar wharf was used as a naval port by the Pakistan Navy's gunboats. This and the nearby airstrip of the Pakistan Air Force were the scene of intense shelling by the Indian Navy during the Bangladesh Liberation War. During the war, Pakistani soldiers killed many people in the town, including eminent lawyer Jnanendralal Chowdhury. The killing of two freedom fighters named Farhad and Subhash at Badar Mokam is also recorded in history.

After Bangladesh's independence, Cox's Bazar started to receive administrative attention. In 1972 the town committee of Cox's Bazar was once again turned into a municipality. In 1975, The Government of Bangladesh established a pilot plant at Kalatali. In 1984, Cox's Bazar subdivision was promoted to a district, and five years later (in 1989) the Cox's Bazar municipality was elevated to B-grade. In 1994 (jobs) the Marine Fisheries and Technology Station (MFTS) was established at Cox's Bazar. MFTS is a research station of Bangladesh Fisheries Research Institute (BFRI) headquartered in Mymensingh. The station covers a land area of four hectares and contains five laboratories.

21st century
In September 2012 the municipality was the site of the Cox's Bazar and Ramu riots, where local Muslims attacked the Buddhist community over an alleged Quran desecration posted to Facebook.

In 2017, hundreds of thousands of Rohingya refugees from Myanmar arrived in Cox's Bazar District, amounting to 725,000 in October 2018; the resulting Kutupalong refugee camp became the largest refugee camp in the world.

On 14 May 2020, the first confirmed case of COVID-19 was detected among the 860,000 refugees who lived in Cox's Bazar district.

In March 2021, a fire at the refugee camp left 15 dead and some 400 missing and displaced more than 45,000 mostly Rohingya refugees.

Geography and climate

The beach in Cox's Bazar has a gentle slope and with an unbroken length of  it is often termed the "longest natural unbroken sea beach" in the world.

Cox's Bazar lies on a coastal plain in the southeastern corner of Bangladesh. From above, the plain appears to bulge out into the Bay of Bengal. Along the shore is an extensive area of beach and dunes. Most of the city is built on a floodplain that is lower in elevation than the dunes, making it more susceptible to flooding due to cyclones and storm surges. The Cox's Bazar coastal plain was formed after the sea reached its present level around 6,500 years ago, with the area of the current floodplain originally forming a sediment sink that has since been gradually filled in by the Bakkhali river as well as smaller streams coming down from the hills.

The climate of Bangladesh is mostly determined by its location in the tropical monsoon climate region: high temperatures, heavy rainfall, and generally excessive humidity, with distinct seasonal variations. The climate of Cox's Bazar is mostly similar to the rest of the country, but with an even wetter southwest monsoon season due to its coastal location.

Educational institutions
1962: Cox's Bazar Government College is the earliest secondary and bachelor's degree offering college founded in Cox's Bazar.

1985: Cox's Bazar Law College is the first profession-based college founded in this district.

1991: Cox's Bazar Govt. Women's College is the first Secondary and bachelor's degree offering college in this district solely for women.

2006: Cox's Bazar Commerce College is the First College only for Business Studies, Humanities and Business Management.

2008: Cox's Bazar Medical College is the first medical college in this district.

2013: Cox's bazar international university is the first private university founded in this district.
The motto of the university is Enlightening Tomorrow.

Other colleges in this area: Cox's Bazar DC College,  Cox's Bazar City College, Ramu Degree College, Ukhiya Degree College, Moin uddin Memorial College Nheela, Teknaf Degree College, Moheskhali degree college,.

High schools: Cox's Bazar Govt. High School, Cox's Bazar Govt. Girl's High School, Cox's Bazar Model High School, Bheola Manik Char High School, Ramu Cantonment English School, Ramu Khizari Govt. High School, Biam Laboratory School and College, Kishalaya Model High School, Chakaria korak biddyapith, Chakaria Govt. High School, Palong Model High School, Shilkhali High School, Pekua, Ukhiya Govt. High School, Nheela High School, Poura Preparatory High School.

Economy and development 

The major economic activity in Cox's Bazar is tourism. A number of hotels, guest houses, and motels have been built in the city and coastal region, and many people are involved in the service industry. Oysters, snails, pearls and their ornaments are very popular with tourists and people are involved in the transportation business for tourists.

People are involved in fishing and collecting seafood and sea products for their livelihood.
Cox's Bazar is one of the few major spots for aquaculture in Bangladesh. Along with Khulna, it is considered a major source of revenue from foreign exchanges. Besides a mix of small-scale agriculture, marine and inland fishing and salt production are other industrial sources that play important roles in the national economy.

In April 2007, as Bangladesh was connected to the submarine cable network as a member of the SEA-ME-WE-4 Consortium, Cox's Bazar was selected as the landing station of the submarine cable.

Transport

Road

The N110 is the national highway that connects the city with country's capital and largest city Dhaka as well as with many other parts of the country via N1.

There are services from companies such as Green Line Paribahan, Shohag Enterprise and many others to travel to Cox's Bazar. The price range for these premium bus rides varies from Tk. 1200 to Tk. 2500 depending on the seats and the bus.

Travelling by bus to Cox's Bazar from Dhaka generally takes about 9–12 hours depending on the traffic.

Airport

The city of Cox's Bazar is served by Cox's Bazar Airport, located northwest of the city. It is one of Bangladesh's busiest domestic airports. The main airlines serving the airport are Biman Bangladesh Airlines, US-Bangla Airlines, Novoair and Regent Airways. In November 2020, Biman Bangladesh Airlines started flights between Sylhet and Cox's Bazar, which was the first direct flight between two cities without any connecting flight from Dhaka. Cox's Bazar Airport is in the process of being upgraded to an international airport in order to attract more tourists. This will make it the fourth international airport in Bangladesh.

Rail
The Cox's Bazar railway station is the main railway station of the district under construction which will provide trains on national routes operated by the state-run Bangladesh Railway. It is expected to be completed by June in 2022.

Tourism

 Cox's Bazar Beach: The beach in Cox's Bazar is the main attraction of the town with an unbroken length of  also termed the "longest natural unbroken sea beach" in the world. There are several 3 stars and 5 star hotels provide the exclusive beachside area with accessories for the tourist. Visitors in other hotels visit Laboni beach which is the area of the beach closest to the town. Other than the beach there are several places of interest near the town which can easily be visited from the town center.
 Himchari National Park : Himchari is located just south of the Cox's Bazar town. It consists of lush tropical rain forest, grasslands and trees, and features a number of waterfalls, the biggest of which cascades down toward the sandy, sun-drenched beach. The National Park was established in 1980 by the Government of Bangladesh as a conservation area for research, education, and recreation. Once it was the stomping grounds of herds of Asian elephant. It is still home to a limited number of these mammals.
Aggmeda Khyang: a large Buddhist monastery, and a place revered by around 400,000 Buddhist people of Cox's Bazar; and the Chittagong Hill Tracts. The main sanctuary is posted on a series of round timber columns. It has a prayer chamber and an assembly hall along with a repository of large and small bronze Buddha images and a number of old manuscripts.
The village sells handicrafts and homemade cigars. There are monasteries, khyangs and pagodas containing images of Buddha in bronze, gold and other metals with precious stones. One of the temples, on the bank of the Baghkhali river, houses relics and Burmese handicrafts, and also a large bronze statue of Buddha measuring thirteen feet high which rests on a six feet high pedestal. Weavers ply their trade in open workshops and craftsmen make handmade cigars in their pagoda like houses.
Bangabandhu Sheikh Mujib Safari Park: Bangabandhu Sheikh MujibSafari Park is the first Safari Park in Bangladesh. Dulahazara Safari Park was developed on an undulating landscape of around 2,224 acres (9.00 km2) of area at Chakaria Upazila in Cox's Bazar District. The nature of the forest is tropical evergreen and rich with Garjan, Boilam, Telsur, and Chapalish along with herbs, shrubs, and creepers. Safari Park is a declared protected area where the animals are kept in a fairly large area with natural environment and visitors can easily see the animal whenever they visit by bus, jeep or on foot. This park was established on the basis of South Asian model. The sanctuary itself protects a large number of wild elephants which are native to the area. In the safari park, there are domesticated elephants which are available for a ride. Other animal attractions include lions, Bengal tigers, Crocodiles, Bears, Chitals and a variety of birds and monkeys.

The only aquarium in Bangladesh is in Cox's Bazar. Attractions also include parasailing, water biking, beach biking, horse riding, Cox Carnival circus show, Daria Nagar Ecopark, Cox's Bazar Development Authority, numerous architectural attractions, Shishu Parks and numerous photogenic sites. The largest safari park in the country, Bangabandhu Safari Park, is nearby. There is a forest reserve, Naf Tourism Park, which also has a cable car planned.

Radiant Fish World: Radiant Fish World is a sea aquarium.
Cox's Bazar–Teknaf Marine Drive: Its the road that goes to Teknaf from Cox's Bazar. There is a sea on one side and hill on the other.

In 2013, the Bangladesh Government formed the Tourist Police unit to protect local and foreign tourists better, as well as to look after the nature and wildlife in the tourist spots of Cox's Bazar.

Gallery

See also
 Cox's Bazar District
Cox's Bazar Beach  on Facebook
 Cox's Bazar Sadar Upazila
 Cox's Bazar Airport
 List of lighthouses in Bangladesh
 Mermaid Beach Resort
 Graduate, Ukhiya-Teknaf

References

External links

Populated places in Chittagong Division
Populated coastal places in Bangladesh
Bay of Bengal
Port cities in Asia
Pourashavas of Bangladesh
Lighthouses in Bangladesh
 
1854 establishments in British India